Daniel Bennett (born November 27, 1979) is an American saxophonist who lives in Manhattan.  Daniel Bennett is best known for his "folk jazz" music.  Bennett contends that his music is "a mix of jazz, folk, and twentieth century minimalism."  The Daniel Bennett Group was voted "Best New Jazz Group" in the New York City Hot House Jazz Awards. Daniel Bennett has performed in Broadway, Off-Broadway and commercial recordings in New York City.

Rochester years
Daniel Bennett was born in Rochester, New York. He first picked up the saxophone at the age of 10 and began playing professionally in 1998.  At that time Bennett was an undergraduate music student at Roberts Wesleyan College.  Daniel Bennett worked with Rochester jazz artists like bassist Ike Sturm, pianist Joe Santora, Sean Jefferson, and drummer Ted Poor. In 1999, Daniel Bennett was introduced to the music of Steve Reich and Philip Glass.  He began to write music for larger ensembles that infused jazz and minimalism.  This led to collaborations with new music artists in Rochester, as well performances at major Rochester venues like Six Flags Darien Lake, the Rochester Lilac Fest, Shewan Hall, and the George Eastman House.

Boston years

In 2002, Daniel Bennett moved to Boston to receive his Masters in Saxophone Performance at the New England Conservatory.  Daniel Bennett studied saxophone with Jerry Bergonzi, as well as classical saxophonist Ken Radnofsky.  During that time, he also met drummer Bob Moses, who encouraged Bennett to pursue his own path towards "folk jazz" music.  In 2004, Daniel Bennett met folk guitarist Chris Hersch.  Hersch was performing full-time in bluegrass groups around Boston.

The two began performing Bennett's original compositions in clubs and various hall around Boston.  The duo released a self-titled EP in March 2005.  Three months later they added bassist John Servo to the group.  After a year of travel, the Daniel Bennett Group released A Nation of Bears, on the Bennett Alliance label.  The album was released in April 2007.  Bennett used repetitious melodic ideas over shifting, odd-metered chord structures.

In February 2007, the Daniel Bennett Group expanded into a full quartet.  The new lineup featured classical guitarist Brant Grieshaber, as well as bassist Jason Davis.  Most notable was the addition of drums to the group for the first time in three years.  Percussionist Rick Landwehr joined the group in May 2007.  The newly formed quartet found its audience in the Boston art scene, performing at venues like the Cambridge ArtCentral Festival, DTR Gallery, Fox Hall Studios, and the Judi Rotenberg Gallery.  The Daniel Bennett Group had considerable success in Boston's jazz club scene, performing regularly at venues like The Beehive and Ryles Jazz Club. In the summer of 2008, the newly formed quartet also collaborated in double bill performances with guitarist Bill Frisell, saxophonist James Carter, and indie rock group Zyrah's Orange.  In the fall of 2009, the band began a weekly artist residency at the famed Liberty Hotel (formerly the historic Charles Street Jail) in Boston's Beacon Hill neighborhood. The Daniel Bennett Group would go on to perform at the hotel for 5 years. Bennett composed the music for Peace and Stability Among Bears during his time at the Liberty Hotel.

New York years

In the summer of 2010, Daniel Bennett moved to New York City, where he enlisted a new cast of musicians that included guitarist Mark Cocheo, bassist Mark Lau, and drummer Brian Adler.  In the winter of 2011, the Daniel Bennett Group organized the popular "Jazz at the Triad" concert series at the Triad Theatre on Manhattan's Upper West Side.  The Daniel Bennett Group currently curates and performs in this ongoing concert series.  Supporting artists on the series have included Charlie Hunter, Steve Kuhn, and Greg Osby.  The concert series quickly garnered critical acclaim throughout the New York media.

In 2015, The Daniel Bennett Group was voted "Best New Jazz Group" in the New York City Hot House Jazz Awards. Daniel Bennett recently composed and performed the original musical scores for 'Frankenstein' and 'Brave Smiles' at the Hudson Guild Theatre in Manhattan. Recent off-Broadway theater performances include the North American premier of 'Legacy Falls' and a revival of 'Swingtime Canteen' at Cherry Lane Theatre. Daniel Bennett recently played woodwinds in 'Blank! The Musical,' the first fully improvised Off-Broadway musical to launch on a national stage. The show was produced by Second City, Upright Citizens Brigade, and Improv Boston.

Bennett Alliance

Bennett founded Bennett Alliance, a music production company and concert organizer serving Massachusetts and New York City, in the spring of 2003. In 2006, Bennett Alliance expanded into an independent record label. Bennett Alliance has released albums for The Kode, JK & the Servomatics, and the Daniel Bennett Group.

The Bennett Alliance Music Fest (formerly Open Fest) is a jazz and folk fest held in Rochester, New York. The Bennett Alliance also produces the Bennett Alliance Concert Series at the Cambridge YMCA Theatre. Bennett Alliance events have featured artists like Bill Frisell, Charlie Hunter, percussionist Billy Martin (of Medeski, Martin, and Wood), Jerry Bergonzi, David Fiuczynski, the Kode, Joy Electric, and Bennett's own ensembles.

Discography
 We Are Not Defeated (2004, Tri-Head Productions)
 A Nation of Bears (2007, Bennett Alliance)
 The Legend of Bear Thompson  (2008, Bennett Alliance)
 Peace and Stability Among Bears (2011, Bennett Alliance)
 Clockhead Goes to Camp (2013, Manhattan Daylight Media)
 The Mystery at Clown Castle (2015, Manhattan Daylight Media)

References

External links
 

1979 births
Roberts Wesleyan University alumni
American male saxophonists
Living people
21st-century American saxophonists
21st-century American male musicians